Mieke Gorissen (born 29 November 1982) is a Belgian long-distance runner. She represented Belgium at the 2020 Summer Olympics in the women's marathon.

Career
Gorissen only began running competitively at the age of 35.

In August 2020, Gorissen competed at the 2020 Belgian Athletics Championships in the 10,000 metres and won a bronze medal.

Gorissen represented Belgium at the 2020 Summer Olympics in the women's marathon and finished in 28th place.

She competed in the women's marathon at the 2022 World Athletics Championships held in Eugene, Oregon, United States.

Personal life
Gorissen holds a master's degree and a PhD in physics and teaches mathematics and physics at a high school in Diepenbeek.

References

External links
 
 
 

1982 births
Living people
Belgian female long-distance runners
Athletes (track and field) at the 2020 Summer Olympics
Olympic athletes of Belgium
Belgian female marathon runners
20th-century Belgian women
21st-century Belgian women